The Winn-Dixie Jacksonville Open was a golf tournament on the Web.com Tour from 2010 to 2012. It was played for the first time in October 2010 at TPC Sawgrass's Dye's Valley Course in Ponte Vedra Beach, Florida. The 2012 purse was US$600,000, with $108,000 going to the winner.

Winners

Bolded golfers graduated to the PGA Tour via the final Web.com Tour money list.

References

Former Korn Ferry Tour events
Golf in Florida
Recurring sporting events established in 2010
Recurring sporting events disestablished in 2012
2010 establishments in Florida
2012 disestablishments in Florida